Halsey McLean Minor Sr. is an American businessman who is known for founding CNET in 1993, the first comprehensive consumer-facing technology content publisher. He is also the founder or co-founder of the technology companies such as the virtual reality startup Live Planet, VideoCoin, and Vivid Labs.

Minor was born in 1964 and raised in Charlottesville, Virginia. He moved to New York City to work as an investment banker for Merrill Lynch. He was an early internet visionary who is the founder of technology companies that have created over $100 billion in cumulative value including CNET, Uphold, Live Planet, Salesforce.com, Google Voice, OpenDNS, Vignette and founder of Vivid Labs. 

Minor is also the founder of Minor Ventures, a venture capital firm dedicated to helping start-ups. Apart from being actively involved in technology and start-ups, he is an avid collector of fine arts, as well as an ardent horse-racing fan. In June 2013, Minor filed for bankruptcy listing his personal debts. 
He continues to have his hand in a number of companies including cryptocurrency company Uphold and Vivid Labs, a publishing and management platform that allows anyone to create, manage and sell multimedia NFTs.

Personal life
Halsey Minor is married to his second wife. He has seven children. Minor was divorced from his first wife in 2005, Deborah Minor. He lives in Beverly Hills, California, but spends much of his time near his family in Virginia. He discovered the identity of his biological father who was living 30 miles away from his son in Benicia, California Minor has donated money to both the Republican and Democratic political parties.

Early life and education
Halsey Minor was born in 1964 in Charlottesville, Virginia. His father was a real estate broker, Charles Venable Minor Jr. His mother bred and trained horses. Some of his grandparents were war heroes in the Civil War and World War II respectively. His first entrepreneurial project was a "triple-decker version of checkers" that Minor created when he was 9 and tried to sell to Milton Bradley. Minor started showing an interest in computers around age 10.

As a teenager, Minor started a fence-painting company. He attended the prestigious all-boys boarding school Woodberry Forest in Madison County, Virginia. Afterwards, he studied anthropology at the University of Virginia, where he joined the Delta Phi fraternity. He initially wanted to help third-world countries develop their infrastructure.

While in college, Minor started a business called the Rental Network, which was a network of public kiosks with information about local housing rentals. After graduating from college in 1987, Minor considered focusing on the Rental Network business, but his friend's father persuaded Minor to get business experience as a financial analyst first.

Career

Early career
Halsey Minor moved to New York City for his first job out of college working for Merrill Lynch as an investment banker. While there, he created a spinoff called Global Publishing Corporation, which focused on sharing information and training materials across Merrill's IT infrastructure.  This was followed by a project with coworker Jeff Bezos to develop software that would have provided custom news feeds based on each user's job description and interests. Merrill Lynch signed a three-year contract to fund the news feed project, then cancelled due to Merrill's poor financial results.
Afterwards, Minor spent a year doing consulting work for EastWest Network, which published magazines typically found on airplanes. He was working on a startup idea using satellites to distribute training content at corporations, before a friend offered him a job at a recruiting firm called Russ Reynolds Associates, where he worked as an executive recruiter.

CNET 
The idea for CNET was conceived by Halsey Minor in 1992. Minor quit his job to start CNET that December with cofounder and former classmate Shelby Bonnie. Bonnie provided $25,000 in seed funding and Minor obtained some other funding through friends and family members. 

Initially, Minor was not able to get any deals with broadcasters to license CNET's TV shows on technology. By 1994, CNET was not able to make payroll. However, that year Minor convinced Microsoft cofounder Paul Allen to invest $5 million for a 20% interest in the company. Also, USA Network bought the rights to CNET's TV show "Central TV." 

Minor bought domains like news.com, tv.com, search.com, shopper.com, and download.com. Over time, he focused more on CNET as an internet publication, rather than a broadcast business, culminating in the launch of CNET.com in June 1995. CNET.com would later become what CNET is best-known for and one of the most highly-trafficked websites on the internet. Minor and CNET also helped create the Internet Advertising Bureau (now known as the Interactive Advertising Bureau) and influenced the development of the online publishing industry. In July 1996, Minor took CNET public. 

In 1997, Minor started a search engine called Snap.com with $25 million in funding and 150 employees from CNET. The decision to create a search engine was "universally booed" and caused CNET's stock to decline. However, two years later Minor sold a 60% interest in Snap to NBC for $500 million. Similarly, investors widely criticized Minor in 1999, when he increased marketing spending from $400,000 to $100 million. However, in hindsight the campaign was later believed to have dramatically increased website traffic and recognition of the CNET brand.

Minor also sold some of CNET's technology rights to a company called Vignette, and he was earning revenue from CNET's advertising sales as the website grew in popularity. CNET joined the NASDAQ 100 and held interests in Vignette, Beyond.com, and others. By 1997, Minor's estimated net worth was $180.2 million. By 2000, his 11 percent interest in CNET alone was worth $495 million. 

In March 2000, Minor retired from his CEO position. Minor remained on the CNET board as Chairman, while cofounder Shelby Bonnie took over as CEO.

Post CNET 
According to Minor, he left CNET to focus on expanding Salesforce.com, where he was the second-largest shareholder when the company went public. Minor was a co-founder of the company and had made an early investment of $19.5 million from his personal wealth in 1999. He was also an early investor in Rhapsody. 

Minor started a venture capital firm called 12 Entrepreneuring in February 2000, but it quickly dissolved due to internal discord and the decline of the tech-sector after the dot-com bubble. He created another venture capital firm focused on software-as-a-service companies in 2004, called Minor Ventures. Minor Ventures did well and invested in Grand Central Communications, which was sold to Google in 2007 for $65 million and later became Google Voice. It installed OpenDNS at its San Francisco office, providing coaching, investments, and administrative support to get the company started.

Bankruptcy 
Minor said he wanted to focus more on philanthropy and venture capitalism, rather than being a CEO. He eventually lost his wealth on real-estate, horse-breeding, legal disputes, and artwork, culminating in a bankruptcy filing in June 2013. Business Insider depicted the decline in Minor's wealth as "most likely due to his expensive taste in real estate, art, and horses." The Washington Post said it was a "post-divorce spending spree." Minor said it was a mix of the overall recession and banking crisis, as well as being depressed after his divorce and his father's suicide.

In 2007, Minor bought the historic Carter's Grove estate from the Colonial Williamsburg Foundation, which he planned to use as a retreat and for horse-breeding. However, Minor never lived at the estate and the vacant 18th century mansion began to fall into disrepair. After he filed for personal bankruptcy in 2013 the property was sold at auction. The Colonial Williamsburg Foundation submitted the only bid at the auction held on May 21, 2014, for the outstanding mortgage amount, and announced that it planned to resell it, with a price increased because of significant costs related to the sale, including over $600,000 in necessary repairs. Around the same time, Minor planned to build a $31 million luxury hotel in his hometown of Charlottesville, Virginia. A dispute formed between Minor and the bank he said was going to provide financing. The project was abandoned in 2009. He also invested in substantial real property assets that declined in value during the housing crisis.

Minor was involved in a series of legal disputes with Christie's and Sotheby's regarding art purchases. A jury awarded $8.57 million to Halsey from Christie's for keeping Halsey’s paintings when the paintings did not sell, despite promising to return them. Minor was required to pay for paintings he bid on but did not pay for. Sotheby’s filed suit for $16.8 million in unpaid debt for paintings Halsey bought. Halsey counter-sued saying that Sotheby’s routinely sold artwork without fully disclosing the paintings were still collateral for the prior owner’s loans. On May 24, 2010,  Minor was ordered to pay the $6.6 million-plus he owed Sotheby's for backing out on his winning bids for three paintings.

When Minor declared bankruptcy, he owed $100 million and had only $50 million in remaining assets.

Recent work 
In 2014, Halsey Minor founded and launched a bitcoin platform Bitreserve now called Uphold.and a virtual reality company called Live Planet. In 2017, Minor created VideoCoin, which uses idle data center servers to support streaming video. In 2021, Minor founded Vivid Labs, a next-generation publishing and management platform that allows anyone to create, manage and sell multimedia NFTs.

References

1964 births
American computer businesspeople
CNET
Living people
University of Virginia alumni
Merrill (company) people
Businesspeople from Charlottesville, Virginia
Woodberry Forest School alumni